Ivan Henning Hjalmar Eklind (October 15, 1905 – July 23, 1981) was a football referee from Sweden known for refereeing the 1934 FIFA World Cup Final between Italy and Czechoslovakia in Rome. He is the youngest referee, to this day, to officiate a FIFA World Cup final at the age of 28.

Career 
Eklind officiated the 1934 FIFA World Cup semi-final Italy–Austria (1–0), as well as the final which Italy won 2–1 over Czechoslovakia. Afterwards he was heavily criticised for having favoured the Italian team with his decisions. According to John Molinaro, Referee Ivan Eklind was said to have met with the Italian fascist dictator Benito Mussolini prior to officiating Italy's semifinal and final games.

Eklind officiated in 6 World Cup finals matches over 3 tournaments (1934–1950) (one as Assistant Referee to Baert in June 1938), including Brazil's triumph against Poland in Strasbourg in which 11 goals were scored, and a Group A match at the 1950 FIFA World Cup. Baert also went to enjoy an incredibly lengthy international career.

References

External links 
 Ivan Eklind at WorldFootball.net
 

1905 births
1981 deaths
FIFA World Cup referees
FIFA World Cup Final match officials
Swedish football referees
1950 FIFA World Cup referees
1938 FIFA World Cup referees
1934 FIFA World Cup referees